Building at 140 W. Main Street is a historic home located at Newark in New Castle County, Delaware.  It was built in 1885 and is a three-story, "L" shaped frame residence in the Second Empire style.  It was built as a single family home, but later divided into apartments.  Also on the property is a carriage house.

It was added to the National Register of Historic Places in 1982.

References

Houses on the National Register of Historic Places in Delaware
Second Empire architecture in Delaware
Houses completed in 1885
Houses in Newark, Delaware
National Register of Historic Places in New Castle County, Delaware